The U.S. Equal Employment Opportunity Commission (EEOC) is a federal agency that was established via the Civil Rights Act of 1964 to administer and enforce civil rights laws against workplace discrimination. The EEOC investigates discrimination complaints based on an individual's race, color, national origin, religion, sex (including sexual orientation, pregnancy, and gender identity), age, disability, genetic information, and retaliation for participating in a discrimination complaint proceeding and/or opposing a discriminatory practice.

The commission also mediates and settles thousands of discrimination complaints each year prior to their investigation.  The EEOC is also empowered to file civil discrimination suits against employers on behalf of alleged victims and to adjudicate claims of discrimination brought against federal agencies. Since 2021, the chair of the EEOC is Charlotte Burrows.

Process and enforcement

Authority 
The EEOC has the authority to investigate and prosecute cases against most organizations, including labor unions and employment agencies, employing 15 workers or more, or, in the case of age discrimination, 20 or more workers. The commissioner of the EEOC can issue charges without a complainant, referred to as a "commissioner's charge." Discrimination complaints can be based on hiring, firing, promotions, harassment, training, wages, and/or benefits, and responsibility covers:

 Title VII of the Civil Rights Act of 1964
 Sections 102 and 103 of the Civil Rights Act of 1991
 Pregnancy Discrimination Act
 Equal Pay Act of 1963
 Title I of the Americans with Disabilities Act of 1990
 Sections 501 and 505 of the Rehabilitation Act of 1973
 Age Discrimination in Employment Act of 1967
 Genetic Information Nondiscrimination Act

Process 
The EEOC investigation is confidential until the charge is filed, when the EEOC has 10 days to notify the employer of the charge. Charges may be filed on behalf of someone else to maintain some anonymity, for example, a parent may file a charge on behalf of a minor child.

Alternative dispute resolution 
Because all federal agencies are required to offer an alternative dispute resolution, the EEOC offers mediation with external or internal professional mediators as a voluntary alternative to litigation, which typically results in faster resolutions. In the 2020 fiscal year (FY), the EEOC reported more than 6,000 mediations conducted recovering nearly half of the $333.2 million in relief from mediation, conciliation, and settlement. Mediation is offered, or can be requested, prior to investigation, or after a finding of discrimination has been issued, during conciliation. If the EEOC does not find merit in the charge, they will not offer, nor allow for a request, for mediation. The average mediation with the EEOC takes 3 months.

Respondent's position statement and investigation 
Employers have 30 days from receipt of a charge to respond to allegations prior to any investigation or mediation offering, or if voluntary mediation was utilized, but unsuccessful. Charging parties have 20 days to respond to the respondent's position statement. The EEOC may ask the employer for additional information such as witness interviews, an on-site interview, or personnel files and policies. An investigator will determine whether or not there is reasonable cause to determine whether or not discrimination has occurred. In FY 2020, the EEOC found 17.4% of charged cases to have merit. The EEOC says investigations typically take 10 months or longer.

Right to Sue 
A Right to Sue gives claimants the right to file a lawsuit in federal court. Right to Sue notices are granted when the agency does not pursue litigation, because the claimant requests the notice after 180 days have elapsed into an investigation; the EEOC finds merit following an investigation, but declines to prosecute; or the agency is unable to determine if there is reasonable cause that the law may have been violated.

Charges filed under the Equal Pay Act or Age Discrimination in Employment Act do not require a Right to Sue. Age discrimination lawsuits may be filed 60 days after the charge has been filed with the EEOC, while lawsuits due to wage discrimination based on sex may be within two years from the last discriminatory paycheck.

Litigation 
The Office of General Counsel, which is led by an appointee of the President that has been confirmed by the Senate for a four-year term, prosecutes EEOC cases in order to recover relief for complainants the agency has found to be victims of discrimination. The EEOC does not have the resources to file a lawsuit in every case where discrimination has been found and weighs the seriousness and potential impact on determining whether or not to litigate. In FY 2020, the EEOC recovered $106 million in relief through litigation of 93 meritorious lawsuits, 13 of which were systemic, accounting for $69.9 million of the relief. The EEOC defines systemic cases as "pattern or practice, policy and/or class cases where the discrimination has a broad impact on an industry, profession, company or geographic location," and all cases are investigated as potentially systemic.

Remedies 
When a finding of discrimination is found by the EEOC, the goal of the agency is injunctive relief, both to put the victim in the position they would have been in had the discrimination not occurred, and to stop and prevent the discriminatory behavior. This could include back-pay, job reinstatement, attorney's fees, expert witness fees, court costs, other compensatory damages, and punitive damages. Age and gender-based are not eligible for compensatory or punitive damages, but instead are limited to liquidated damages equal to the amount of back pay. Compensatory and punitive damages are limited per employee by the size of the employer:

 For employers with 15-100 employees, the limit is $50,000.
 For employers with 101-200 employees, the limit is $100,000.
 For employers with 201-500 employees, the limit is $200,000.
 For employers with more than 500 employees, the limit is $300,000.

Investigative compliance policy 
EEOC applies an investigative compliance policy when respondents are uncooperative in providing information during an investigation of a charge. If a respondent fails to turn over requested information, field offices are to subpoena the information, file a direct suit on the merits of a charge, or use the legal principle of adverse inference, which assumes the withheld information is against the respondent.

History 
On March 6, 1961, President John F. Kennedy signed Executive Order 10925, which required government contractors to "take affirmative action to ensure that applicants are employed and that employees are treated during employment without regard to their race, creed, color, or national origin." It established the President's Committee on Equal Employment Opportunity, which then Vice President Lyndon Johnson was appointed to head. This was the forerunner of the EEOC.

The EEOC was established on July 2, 1965. Management directive 715 is a regulatory guidance document from the commission to all federal agencies regarding adherence to equal opportunity employment laws and reporting requirements.

The EEOC's first complainants were female flight attendants. However, the EEOC at first ignored sex discrimination complaints, and the prohibition against sex discrimination in employment went unenforced for the next few years. One EEOC director called the prohibition "a fluke... conceived out of wedlock."

In 2005, the EEOC established the Systemic Task Force (STF) to evaluate how the agency combats systemic discrimination. In March 2006, the STF determined that the agency could not effectively address system discrimination without a nationwide system, but that the EEOC was uniquely prepared to fight systemic discrimination because the EEOC's broad authority, commissioner's charges, access to data, exemption from Rule 23 of the Federal Rules of Civil Procedure, focus on injunctive relief, and nationwide coverage. As a result, the commission created the role of Systemic Coordinator and Lead Systemic Investigator, and implemented programs that resulted in improved systemic expertise in the agency and all charges being investigated as potential systemic cases.

In 2008, disability-based charges handled by the EEOC rose to a record 19,543, up 10.2 percent from the prior year and the highest level since 1995. That may again be showing that because the EEOC has not adjusted many of their initial 1991 fines for inflation, the backlog of EEOC cases illustrates erosion of deterrence.

In 2011, the Commission included "sex-stereotyping" of lesbian, gay, and bisexual individuals, as a form of sex discrimination illegal under Title VII of the Civil Rights Act of 1964. In 2012, the Commission expanded protection provided by Title VII to transgender status and gender identity. In 2015, it concluded that for Title VII, sex discrimination includes discrimination based on sexual orientation. The Supreme Court upheld this position in R.G. & G.R. Harris Funeral Homes Inc. v. Equal Employment Opportunity Commission in 2020.

In 2012, the EEOC achieved a second consecutive year of a significant reduction in the charge inventory, something not seen since FY 2002.  Due to a concerted effort, the EEOC reduced the pending inventory of private sector charges by 10 percent from FY 2011, bringing the inventory level to 70,312.  This inventory reduction is the second consecutive decrease of almost ten percent in charge inventory.

During FY 2020, the EEOC secured a record amount of recovery, more than $535 million, for victims of discrimination in the workplace. Also, the agency reduced the private sector charge inventory by nearly 4 percent to the lowest level in 14 years. Notably, the agency increased the percentage of charges resolved and those with an outcome favorable to the charging party increased by nearly two percent, to 17.4 percent.

Staffing, workload, and backlog
In 1975, when the backlog reached more than 100,000 charges to be investigated, President Gerald Ford's full requested budget of $62 million was approved. A "Backlog Unit" was created in Philadelphia in 1978 to resolve the thousands of federal equal employment complaints inherited from the Civil Service Commission. In 1980, Eleanor Holmes Norton began re-characterizing the backlog cases as "workload" in her reports to Congress, thus fulfilling her promise to eliminate the backlog.

In June 2006, civil rights and labor union advocates publicly complained that the effectiveness of the EEOC was being undermined by budget and staff cuts and the outsourcing of complaint screening to a private contractor whose workers were poorly trained. In 2006, a partial budget freeze prevented the agency from filling vacant jobs, and its staff had shrunk by nearly 20 percent from 2001. A Bush administration official stated that the cuts had been made because it was necessary to direct more money to defense and homeland security. By 2008, the EEOC had lost 25 percent of its staff over the previous eight years, including investigators and lawyers who handle the cases. The number of complaints to investigate grew to 95,400 in fiscal 2008, up 26 percent from 2006.

The outsourcing to Pearson Government Solutions in Kansas cost the agency $4.9 million and was called a "huge waste of money" by the president of the EEOC employees' union in 2006.

Race and ethnicity 

The EEOC requires employers to report various information about their employees, in particular their racial/ethnic categories, to prevent discrimination based on race/ethnicity. The definitions used in the report have been different at different times.

In 1997, the Office of Management and Budget gave a Federal Register Notice, the "Revisions to the Standards for the Classification of Federal Data on Race and Ethnicity," which defined new racial and ethnic definitions. As of September 30, 2007, the EEOC's EEO-1 report must use the new racial and ethnic definitions in establishing grounds for racial or ethnic discrimination. If an employee identifies their ethnicity as "Hispanic or Latino" as well as a race, the race is not reported in EEO-1, but it is kept as part of the employment record.

A person's skin color or physical appearance can also be grounds for a case of racial discrimination. Discrimination based on national origin can be grounds for a case on discrimination as well.

Successes

On May 1, 2013, a Davenport, Iowa jury awarded the U.S. Equal Employment Opportunity Commissission damages totaling $240 million — the largest verdict in the federal agency's history — for disability discrimination and severe abuse. The jury agreed with the EEOC that Hill County Farms, doing business as Henry's Turkey Service subjected a group of 32 men with intellectual disabilities to severe abuse and discrimination for a period between 2007 and 2009, after 20 years of similar mistreatment. This victory received international attention and was profiled in the New York Times.

On June 1, 2015, the U.S. Supreme Court held in an 8–1 decision written by Justice Antonin Scalia that an employer may not refuse to hire an applicant if the employer was motivated by avoiding the need to accommodate a religious practice. Such behavior violates the prohibition on religious discrimination contained in Title VII of the Civil Rights Act of 1964. EEOC General Counsel David Lopez hailed the decision. "At its root, this case is about defending the quintessentially American principles of religious freedom and tolerance," Lopez said. "This decision is a victory for our increasingly diverse society and we applaud Samantha Elauf's courage and tenacity in pursuing this matter.”

Criticism 
Some employment-law professionals criticized the agency after it issued advice that requiring a high school diploma from job applicants could violate the Americans with Disabilities Act. The advice letter stated that the longtime lowest common denominator of employee screening must be "job-related for the position in question and consistent with business necessity." A Ballard Spahr lawyer suggested, "There will be less incentive for the general public to obtain a high school diploma if many employers eliminate that requirement for job applicants in their workplace."

The EEOC has been criticized for alleged heavy-handed tactics in their 1980 lawsuit against retailer Sears, Roebuck & Co. Based on a statistical analysis of personnel and promotions, EEOC argued that Sears both was systematically excluding women from high-earning positions in commission sales and was paying female management lower wages than male management. Sears, represented by lawyer Charles Morgan, Jr., counter-argued that the company had encouraged female applicants for sales and management, but women preferred lower-paying positions with more stable daytime working hours, as compared to commission sales, which demanded evening and weekend shifts and featured drastically varying paychecks, depending on the numbers of sales in a given pay period. In 1986, the court ruled in favor of Sears on all counts and noted that the EEOC had neither produced a single witness who alleged discrimination nor identified any Sears policy that discriminated against women.

In a 2011 ruling against the EEOC, Judge Loretta A. Preska declared that the agency relied too heavily on anecdotal claims rather than on hard data, in a lawsuit against Bloomberg, L.P. that alleged discrimination against pregnant employees. In a ruling described in the New York Times as "strongly worded," Preska wrote, "the law does not mandate 'work-life balance' and added that while Bloomberg had expected high levels of dedication from employees, the company did not treat women who took pregnancy leave differently from those who took leave for other reasons.

During the Trump administration, the EEOC came under criticism for being ineffective. The budget allocated to the EEOC by Congress has forced it to downsize, cutting its original staffing levels by over 40%.

Commissioners
All Commission seats and the post of general counsel to the commission are filled by the U.S. president, subject to confirmation by the Senate.

Current 

† Reappointed to serve a second consecutive term.

Former 

 Luther Holcomb, 1965–1974
 Aileen Hernandez, 1965–1966
 Vicente T. Ximenes, 1967–1971
 Samuel C. Jackson, 1965–1968
 Richard Alton Graham, 1965–1966
 Elizabeth Kuck, 1968–1970
 Ethel B. Walsh, 1971–1980
 Colston A. Lewis, 1970–1977
 Raymond Telles, 1971–1976
 J. Clay Smith Jr., 1978–1982
 Hon. Daniel Leach, 1976–1981
 Armando Rodriguez, 1978–1983
 Cathie Shattuck, 1982–1983
 Clarence Thomas, 1982–1990
 Tony Gallegos, 1982–1994
 R. Gaull Silberman, 1984–1995
 Joy Cherian, 1987–1993
 William Webb, 1982–1986
 Fred Alvarez, 1984–1987
 Evan J. Kemp, Jr., 1987–1993
 Joyce Tucker, 1990–1996
 Gilbert Casellas, 1994-1997
 Paul Igasaki, 1994-2002
 Paul Steven Miller, 1994–2004
 Reginald E. Jones, 1996–2000
 Ida L. Castro, 1998–2001
 Cari M. Dominguez, 2001–2006
 Leslie E. Silverman, 2002–2008
 Stuart J. Ishimaru, 2003–2012
 Naomi C. Earp, 2003–2009
 Christine Griffin, 2006–2009
 Constance S. Barker, 2008–2016
 Jacqueline A. Berrien, 2010–2014
 Chai Feldblum, 2010–2019
 Jenny R. Yang, 2010–2019
 Victoria Lipnic, 2010–2019
 Janet Dhillon, 2019–2022

Chairs

General counsels 
 Charles T. Duncan, 1965–1966
Richard Berg (acting), 1966–1967
Kenneth Holbert (acting), 1967
Daniel Steiner, 1967–1969
Russell Spector (acting), 1969
Stanley P. Herbert, 1969–1971
Jack Pemberton, 1971–1972
William Carey, 1972–1975
Julia Cooper (acting), 1975
Abner Sibal, 1975–1978
Charles A. Shanor, 1987–1990
 Donald Livingston, 1990–1993
 Clifford Gregory Stewart, 1995–2000
 Eric Dreiband, 2003–2005
 Ronald S. Cooper, 2006–2009
 David Lopez, 2010–2016
Sharon Fast Gustafson, 2019–2021

See also

 Equal employment opportunity
 Title 29 of the Code of Federal Regulations
 PATCOB
 Race and ethnicity (EEO)
 Katherine Pollak Ellickson
 USA.gov

References

External links

 
 Proposed and finalized federal regulations from the Equal Employment Opportunity Commission
 Role of Equal employment opportunity commission
Records of the Equal Employment Opportunity Commission in the National Archives (Record Group 403)
nytimes.com, discusses the fairly recent case involving allegations against Bloomberg unfairly treating pregnant women. Bloomberg won because of a lack of statistics on the Equal Employment Opportunity Commission's part. However, it is still possible for the federal government to appeal and the witnesses can individually sue Bloomberg for discrimination.
https://en.wikisource.org/wiki/Federal_Civil_Penalties_Inflation_Adjustment_Act_of_1990

 
Civil rights organizations in the United States
Disability rights organizations
Government agencies established in 1965
Independent agencies of the United States government
United States administrative law
Second-wave feminism
Demographics of the United States
Race and law in the United States
1965 establishments in Washington, D.C.